The 1991 East Coast Conference men's basketball tournament was held March 2–4, 1991.  The champion gained and an automatic berth to the NCAA tournament.

Bracket and results

{{3RoundBracket-Byes
| group1 =
| group2 =

| RD1=QuarterfinalsSaturday, March 2
| RD2=SemifinalsSunday, March 3
| RD3=FinalMonday, March 4

| RD1-seed3  = 4
| RD1-team3  = 
| RD1-score3 = 58
| RD1-seed4  = 5
| RD1-team4  = 
| RD1-score4 = 67

| RD1-seed5  = 3
| RD1-team5  = Drexel
| RD1-score5 = 68
| RD1-seed6  = 6
| RD1-team6  = 
| RD1-score6 = 71

| RD1-seed7  = 2
| RD1-team7  = | RD1-score7 = 99| RD1-seed8  = 7
| RD1-team8  = 
| RD1-score8 = 85

| RD2-seed1  = 1
| RD2-team1  = Towson State| RD2-score1 = 78| RD2-seed2  = 5
| RD2-team2  = UMBC
| RD2-score2 = 76

| RD2-seed3  = 6
| RD2-team3  = Rider| RD2-score3 = 77| RD2-seed4  = 2
| RD2-team4  = Delaware
| RD2-score4 = 75

| RD3-seed1  = 1
| RD3-team1  = Towson State| RD3-score1 = 69'| RD3-seed2  = 6
| RD3-team2  = Rider
| RD3-score2 = 63
}}

* denotes overtime game

All-Tournament Team
 Devin Boyd, Towson State
 Alexander Coles, Delaware
 Terrance Jacobs, Towson State
 Chuck Lightening, Towson State
 Darrick Suber, Rider – Tournament MVP''
Source

References

East Coast Conference (Division I) men's basketball tournament
Tournament